This is a list of Lindenwood Lions football season records. The Lindenwood Lions football team is the football team of Lindenwood University, located in the American city of St. Charles, Missouri. The team competes as a Mid-America Intercollegiate Athletics Association (MIAA) at the NCAA Division II level.

Since 1990, the Lindenwood's football team has played in Harlen C. Hunter Stadium.

References

Lindenwood Lions

Lindenwood Lions football seasons